ValuJet Airlines Flight 592 was a regularly scheduled flight from Miami International Airport to Hartsfield–Jackson Atlanta International Airport. On May 11, 1996, the ValuJet Airlines McDonnell Douglas DC-9 operating the route crashed into the Everglades about 10 minutes after taking off from Miami as a result of a fire in the cargo compartment caused by mislabeled and improperly stored hazardous cargo. All 110 people on board died. The airline already had a poor safety record before the crash, and the accident brought widespread attention to the airline's problems. The airline was grounded for several months after the accident. When operations resumed, ValuJet was unable to attract the same numbers of customers as it had before the accident. It acquired AirTran in 1997, but the lingering damage to the ValuJet name led ValuJet executives to assume the AirTran name.

Background
ValuJet Airlines was founded in 1992 and was known for its sometimes aggressive cost-cutting measures. Many of the airline's planes were purchased used from other airlines, little training was provided to workers, and contractors were used for maintenance and other services. The company quickly developed a reputation for its lax safety. In 1995, the U.S. military refused ValuJet's bid to fly military personnel because of safety worries, and officials at the Federal Aviation Administration (FAA) wanted the airline to be grounded.

In 1986, an American Trans Air McDonnell Douglas DC-10 being serviced at Chicago's O'Hare International Airport had been destroyed on the ground by a fire caused by chemical oxygen generators. On February 3, 1988, American Airlines Flight 132 (operated by a McDonnell Douglas MD-80) had a similar incident to that which later downed ValuJet Flight 592: a fire began in the cargo hold while the plane was in flight, caused by hazardous materials (primarily hydrogen peroxide), but in that case the crew landed the aircraft safely.

After AA Flight 132, the National Transportation Safety Board (NTSB) recommended to the FAA that all class D cargo holds have smoke detectors and fire suppression systems.

Aircraft and crew
The aircraft, a DC-9-32 registered N904VJ, was the 496th DC-9 assembled at the Long Beach plant. It was 27 years old at the time of the accident and had been previously flown by Delta Air Lines. Its first flight was April 18, 1969 and it was delivered to Delta on May 27, 1969 as N1281L. The airframe flew for Delta until the end of 1992, when it was retired and sold back to McDonnell Douglas. McDonnell Douglas then sold the plane to ValuJet in 1993. The aircraft was powered by two Pratt & Whitney JT8D-9A turbofan engines.

The aircraft had suffered a series of incidents in the two years before the crash, including two aborted takeoffs and eight emergency landings. Engine and pressurization errors were the primary issues in several of the incidents. In May 1995, the FAA issued a re-wiring directive for all DC-9 cockpits because the wire bundles in the switch panel could cause "fire and uncontrolled smoke throughout the cockpit as a result of chafing and shorting."

In the flight deck were two experienced pilots: Captain Candi Kubeck (35) and First Officer Richard Hazen (52). Captain Kubeck had accumulated 8,928 total flight hours throughout her career (including 2,116 hours on the DC-9) and First Officer Hazen had more than 11,800 total flight hours throughout his career, with 2,148 of them on the DC-9.

Accident
On the afternoon of May 11, 1996, Flight 592 pushed back from gate G2 in Miami after a delay of 1 hour and 4 minutes due to mechanical problems. There were 110 people on board: 105 passengers, mainly from Florida and Georgia, and a crew of two pilots and three flight attendants. At 2:04 PM EDT, the DC-9 took off from runway 9L (now runway 8R) and began a normal climb.

At 2:10 p.m the passengers started to smell smoke. At the same time, the pilots heard a loud bang in their headsets and noticed the plane was losing electrical power. The sag in electrical power and the bang were eventually determined to be the result of a tire in the cargo hold exploding. Seconds later, a flight attendant entered the cockpit and informed the flight crew of a fire in the passenger cabin. Passengers' shouts of "fire, fire, fire" were recorded on the cockpit voice recorder (CVR) when the cockpit door was opened. Though ValuJet's flight attendant training manual stated that the cockpit door should not be opened when smoke or other harmful gases might be present in the cabin, the intercom was not functional and informing the pilots of what was happening was difficult. The flight data recorder (FDR) indicated a progressive failure of the DC-9's electrical and flight control systems due to the spreading fire.

Kubeck and Hazen immediately asked air traffic control for a return to Miami due to the increasing smoke in the cockpit and cabin, and were given instructions for a return to the airport. One minute later, Hazen requested the nearest available airport.  Kubeck began to turn the plane left in preparation for the return to Miami.

Flight 592 disappeared from radar at 2:13:42 PM, the exact time that it crashed. Kubeck lost control of the plane less than 10 seconds before impact. Examination of debris suggested that the fire had burned through the floorboards in the cabin, resulting in structural failure and damage to cables underneath the instrument panels. The NTSB report on the accident stated, "the Safety Board cannot rule out the possibility that the flightcrew was incapacitated by smoke or heat in the cockpit during the last 7 seconds of the flight." Interruptions in the cockpit voice recorder occurred on two occasions, one as long as 1 minute 12 seconds. The aircraft hit the water at 2:13:42 PM EDT, about 10 minutes after takeoff. The impact site was on the eastern edge of Florida Water Conservation Area 3B, between two levees, in an area known as the L-67 Pocket.

All on board were killed in the crash. Recovery of the aircraft and victims was made extremely difficult by the location of the crash. The nearest road of any kind was more than a quarter of a mile (400 m) away from the crash scene, and the location of the crash itself was a deep-water swamp with a floor of solid limestone. The aircraft was destroyed on impact, with no large pieces of the fuselage remaining. Sawgrass, alligators, and risk of bacterial infection from cuts plagued searchers involved in the recovery effort.

According to the NTSB's report, two witnesses fishing nearby testified that "they saw a low-flying airplane in a steep right bank. According to these witnesses, as the right bank angle increased, the nose of the airplane dropped and continued downward. The airplane struck the ground in a nearly vertical attitude."

They reported seeing no external damage or any sign of fire or smoke other than the engine exhaust. A group of sightseers in a small private plane also witnessed the crash and provided a nearly identical account, stating that Flight 592 seemed to "disappear" after hitting the swamp and they could see nothing but scattered small debris, part of an engine, and a large pool of jet fuel near the crash site.

Victims

Notable passengers killed on the flight included:
 San Diego Chargers running back Rodney Culver
 Songwriter and musician Walter Hyatt
 DelMarie Walker, 38, the prime suspect in a murder in Georgia

Recovery of the passengers and crew took several weeks, and little in the way of intact human remains was found due to the sheer violence of the impact, immersion in swamp water, and scavenging by wildlife. About 68 of the 110 people aboard the plane were identified, in some cases from examining jawbones, and at least one individual from a single tooth. A piece of torn flesh was proven to belong to First Officer Hazen, but Captain Kubeck's remains were never found. Due to the above-mentioned factors, performing toxicology tests on the passenger and crew remains, to determine how much exposure they would have had to fumes and smoke from the in-flight fire, was not possible.

Investigation
At the end of a fifteen-month investigation, the National Transportation Safety Board (NTSB) determined that the fire that downed Flight 592 developed in a cargo compartment below the passenger cabin. The cargo compartment was a Class D design, in which fire suppression is accomplished by sealing off the hold from outside air. Any fire in such an airtight compartment would quickly exhaust all available oxidizers and then burn itself out. As the fire suppression can be accomplished without any intervention by the crew, such holds are not equipped with smoke detectors. However, the NTSB quickly determined that just before takeoff, 144 expired chemical oxygen generators, each slightly larger than the size of a tennis ball can, had been placed in the cargo compartment in five boxes marked COMAT (company material) by ValuJet's maintenance contractor, SabreTech, in violation of Federal Aviation Administration (FAA) regulations forbidding the transport of hazardous materials in passenger aircraft cargo holds. Failure to cover the generators' firing pins with the prescribed plastic caps made an accidental activation much more likely. The investigation revealed that rather than covering them, the cords attached to the firing pins were simply cut or duct-taped around the cans, and Scotch tape was also used to stick the ends down. SabreTech employees indicated on the cargo manifest that the "oxy canisters", which were loosely packed in the boxes that were each sealed with tape and bubble wrap, were "empty". ValuJet workers then loaded the boxes in the cargo hold in the mistaken belief that the devices that they contained were just empty canisters, thus being certified as supposedly "safe" to transport on a passenger aircraft, when in fact they were neither simple oxygen canisters, nor empty.

Chemical oxygen generators, when activated, produce oxygen for passengers if the plane suffers a decompression. However, they also produce a great quantity of heat due to the exothermic nature of the chemical reaction involved. Therefore, not only could the heat and generated oxygen start a fire, but the oxygen could also keep the fire burning. The fire was worsened by the presence of two main aircraft tires (one of them mounted on a main wheel) and a nose tire and wheel that were also included in the list of materials shipped as COMAT. Investigators determined that one of the oxygen generators was likely triggered when the plane experienced a slight jolt while taxiing.  As the aircraft taxied and took off, the generator began accumulating heat, soon setting fire to its surroundings.

The oxygen from the generators fed the resulting fire in the cargo hold without any need for outside air, defeating the cargo hold's airtight design. A pop and jolt heard on the cockpit voice recording and correlated with a brief and dramatic spike in the altimeter reading in the flight data recording were attributed to the sudden cabin pressure change caused by one of the wheels in the cargo hold exploding due to the heat. Investigators also determined that in this process, the fire began to destroy control cables that ran to the back of the aircraft, which explained why the pilots began losing control before the plane crashed; the NTSB concluded that the aircraft was under positive control by the pilots until the time of the sharp right turn and dive immediately prior to impact.

Smoke detectors in the cargo holds can alert the flight crew of a fire long before the problem becomes apparent in the cabin, and a fire suppression system buys valuable time to land the plane safely. In February 1998, the FAA issued revised standards requiring all Class D cargo holds to be converted by early 2001 to Class C or E; these types of holds have additional fire detection and suppression equipment.

Culpability
The NTSB report placed responsibility for the accident on three parties:
 SabreTech, for improperly packaging and storing hazardous materials
 ValuJet, for not supervising SabreTech
 FAA, for not mandating smoke detection and fire suppression systems in cargo holds as recommended in 1988 after a similar incident

In 1997, a federal grand jury indicted SabreTech for mishandling hazardous materials, failing to train its employees in proper handling of hazardous materials, conspiracy, and making false statements. SabreTech's maintenance supervisor, Daniel Gonzalez, and two mechanics who worked on the plane, Eugene Florence and Mauro Ociel Valenzuela-Reyes, were charged with conspiracy and making false statements. Two years later, having been found guilty on the mishandling hazardous materials and improper training charges, SabreTech was fined $2 million and ordered to pay $9 million in restitution. Gonzalez and Florence were acquitted on all charges, while Valenzuela failed to appear and was indicted in absentia for contempt of court. Valenzuela is still a fugitive as of 2021; he was specifically highlighted in the EPA's announcement of a website to search for "environmental fugitives." The FBI has offered a $10,000 reward for information on his whereabouts.

ValuJet was grounded by the FAA on June 16, 1996, and was allowed to resume flying again on September 30, but never recovered from the crash. In 1997, the company acquired AirTran Airways. Although ValuJet was the nominal survivor, the ValuJet executives believed that a new name was important to regain passenger traffic. AirTran made little mention of its past as ValuJet. In 2011, AirTran was purchased by Southwest Airlines.

Many families of Flight 592's victims were outraged that ValuJet was not prosecuted, given the airline's poor safety record. ValuJet's accident rate was not only one of the highest in the low-fare sector, but also 14 times higher than that of legacy airlines. In the aftermath of the crash, an internal FAA memo surfaced questioning whether ValuJet should have been allowed to stay in the air. The victims' families also point to statements made by ValuJet's officials immediately after the crash which led many to believe that ValuJet knew the generators were on the plane, and had ordered them returned to Atlanta rather than properly disposed of in Miami.

Legacy

On the third anniversary of the accident, in 1999, a memorial was dedicated to the victims in the Everglades. The memorial, consisting of 110 concrete pillars, is located just north of Tamiami Trail, about 12 miles west of Krome Avenue in Miami-Dade County. It points to the location of the crash site 12 miles to the north-northeast. Students from the American Institute of Architecture designed the memorial, and local contractors, masons, and labor unions built it for free.

In popular culture
Three National Geographic shows, Why Planes Crash ("Fire In The Sky"), Seconds From Disaster ("Florida Swamp Air Crash"), and Mayday ("Fire in the Hold"), covered the crash. It was also featured in the last episode of the four-part Travel Channel series Probable Cause: Air Crash Investigations (Acceptable Risk) and an episode of COPS being filmed in the Miami area at the time.

See also
List of accidents and incidents involving commercial aircraft

Notes

References

Further reading
  – Langewiesche presents a case that the ValuJet crash is an example of a "system accident," including the overly formal labeling and safety information on the oxygen 'canisters' (which actually were oxygen generators).
  (Subscription required for access to full article.)
 Flight 592 special report (CNN)
 NTSB brief report
 NTSB full report (PDF)
 Valenzuela's post on US EPA's Fugitive Site 
Valenzuela's post on US FBI's Most Wanted list 
 Audio transcript of the Air Traffic Control conversations
 
 Tester, Hank. "ValuJet Crash Remembered 15 Years Later" (Archive). NBC Miami. Wednesday May 11, 2011.
  – Transcript of the Valujet 592 flight recorder.
 Memorial location on Google Maps
 ValuJet Flight 592 Memorial

External links
 
 
 Photo of the plane after being retired by Delta and bought by Valujet
 Photo of the plane while in service with Valujet
 

ValuJet Airlines accidents and incidents
Aviation accidents and incidents in the United States in 1996
Airliner accidents and incidents in Florida
Accidents and incidents involving the McDonnell Douglas DC-9
1996 in Florida
Airliner accidents and incidents caused by in-flight fires
Everglades
Miami-Dade County, Florida
May 1996 events in the United States
Monuments and memorials in Florida